Innovate Pro Wrestling (formerly Championship Wrestling Alliance and NWA Smoky Mountain) is an American independent professional wrestling promotion based in Kingsport, Tennessee. The company was established in 2004 and until 2017 it was associated with the National Wrestling Alliance.  During its time in the NWA, NWA Smoky Mountain Wrestling was considered the flagship promotion of the National Wrestling Alliance.

History

The promotion was founded by wrestler Tony Givens in 2004, as the Championship Wrestling Alliance, after breaking away from Southern States Wrestling. That same year, Championship Wrestling TV began airing locally on WCYB-DT2 and was later syndicated nationally on AMG-TV. It held weekly television tapings at the National Guard Armory in Morristown, Tennessee as well as house shows throughout East Tennessee. The promotion joined the National Wrestling Alliance as NWA Smoky Mountain Wrestling in early-2011. The announcement was made by CWA Commissioner Robbie Cassidy on the March 13th TV taping of Championship Wrestling TV in Gray, Tennessee. On July 7, 2012, an unidentified fan attacked Cassidy and Tony Givens at an interpromotional show co-hosted by the Pro Wrestling Federation. The fan was subdued by Cassidy and police escorted him out of the building.

On April 6, 2013, NWA Smoky Mountain drew its biggest crowd to date with 2,017 fans attending a NWA Smoky Mountain TV television taping at Elizabethton High School. In October 2013, Givens attempted to raise $15,000 on Kickstarter.com to improve the production values for NWA Smoky Mountain TV. The appeal raised only $1,485 before the 60-day deadline. The show became available on YouTube the following year.

NWA Smoky Mountain is advertised as a "spiritual successor" of the original Smoky Mountain Wrestling and has used a mix of SMW alumni and younger Southern independent wrestlers since its inception. Among the SMW talent to appear for the promotion include, most notably, Bunkhouse Buck, Eddie Golden, Tom Prichard, Tracy Smothers and Ricky Morton. On January 6, 2014, Morton defeated Chase Owens at an NWA Smoky Mountain show to win the NWA World Junior Heavyweight Championship.

A number of top NWA stars have also visited the promotion. In February 2015, Jason Kincaid was interviewed on Pipebomb Radio. He was billed as the longest-reigning NWA Southeastern Heavyweight Championship in the company's history. On April 17, 2015, Jax Dane won the Smoky Mountain Cup and earned a title shot for the NWA World Heavyweight Championship. He defeated then champion Hiroyoshi Tenzan for the title four months later. NWA Smoky Mountain's "Collision Course 10", held on May 9, 2015, nearly sold out the Civic Auditorium in Kingsport, Tennessee. Bobby Eaton also made a special appearance managing Eddie Golden against Jeff Tankersley on the undercard. Larry Goodman of GeorgiaWrestlingHistory.com claimed that the show, headlined by an A.J. Styles versus Chase Owens bout, "[shattered] the company's attendance and gate records". NWA President R. Bruce Tharpe visited Kingsport for the first time at this event.

On October 17, 2015, NWA Smoky Mountain held a special tribute show, "Enter the Dragon", for Ricky Steamboat. Steamboat served as Ricky Morton's cornerman in a "student vs. teacher" grudge match against Kid Kash as part of Kash's retirement tour. This turned a no-holds-barred grudge match after a falling out between the two during a tag team bout.

At ReGenesis on August 19, 2017; promoter Tony Givens announced that NWA Smoky Mountain Wrestling was leaving the NWA, and thus the promotion was changing their name to Innovate Wrestling.

Championships and accomplishments

Current championships and accomplishments

Past championships

Retired championships

Other championships

Roster

Current roster

Managers

Other personnel

Former personnel 

Male wrestlers

Female wrestlers

Stables and tag teams

Managers and valets

Commentators and interviewers

Referees

Other personnel

The Finale
The Finale is an annual professional wrestling event held by NWA Smoky Mountain Wrestling in the month of December.

The Finale (2013)

The Finale (2014)

The Finale (2015)

See also
List of National Wrestling Alliance territories
List of independent wrestling promotions in the United States

References

External links
 

Smoky Mountain Wrestling
Independent professional wrestling promotions based in Tennessee
National Wrestling Alliance members
2004 establishments in Tennessee